The FG-02 was a Chinese solid rocket motor burning Polysulfide. It was developed by China Hexi Chemical and Machinery Corporation (also known as the 6th Academy of CASIC) for use in the Long March 1 third stage. It used spin stabilization and a timing device to ignite in flight.

The Long March 1 is basically a DF-4 with a solid third stage and a fairing. So the FG-02 was developed as the third stage to add to the stack. It was initially tested on two launches aboard T-7A sounding rockets to validate high altitude ignitions. Both successful flights were performed on August 1968. It performed just two orbital flights, both from Jiuquan and both successful. The first was on April 24, 1970, to orbit the indigenous satellite, the Dong Fang Hong I. And the second was on March 3, 1971, on the Shijian 1 mission.

See also
 Dong Fang Hong I
 Long March 1

References

Rocket stages
Rocket engines of China
Solid-fuel rockets